Wir, WIR or WiR may also refer to:

Organisations
 WIR Bank, a complementary currency system in Switzerland
 Washington and Idaho Railway
 West India Regiments, a colonial regiment of the British Army
 Wolność i Równość, a Polish political party
 Workers International Relief, organization of famine relief and propaganda agencies established by the Comintern

Arts and entertainment
 We (novel), a 1921 novel (Russian: Мы; German: Wir) by Yevgeny Zamyatin
 Wir (film), a 1982 German film adaptation of the novel We (Russian: Мы; German: Wir; English: We) by Yevgeny Zamyatin
 Wreck-It Ralph, a Disney movie

Other uses
 Wikipedian in residence, a Wikipedia editor who accepts a placement with an institution
 Wir, Masovian Voivodeship, a village in Poland
 Wire (band), a British punk group that called itself Wir for one album
 Women in Red, a volunteer project which focuses on creating new Wikipedia articles about women
 Women in Refrigerators, a common comic book trope

See also
 VIR (disambiguation)